Kelly Ann Laurin (born November 16, 2005) is a Canadian pair skater. With her skating partner, Loucas Éthier, she is the 2022 Skate America bronze medallist.

Career

Early years 
Laurin began learning to skate in 2011. In 2018, she teamed up with Loucas Éthier. The two won gold in the novice pairs' event at the 2019 Canadian Championships.

2019–20 season 
Laurin/Éthier appeared at one ISU Junior Grand Prix event, placing sixth in Poland. They became junior national bronze medallists at the 2020 Canadian Championships and were assigned to the 2020 World Junior Championships, where they finished fourteenth.

2020–21 season 
Laurin/Éthier placed second in junior pairs at the Skate Canada Challenge, a qualifier for the 2021 Canadian Championships. The latter event was cancelled, along with many internationals, due to the COVID-19 pandemic.

2021–22 season 
The pair moved up to the senior ranks for the 2021–22 season. They placed sixth at the 2022 Canadian Championships.

2022–23 season 
Making their senior international debut, Laurin/Éthier placed fifth at the 2022 CS U.S. International Figure Skating Classic. They were then invited to make their Grand Prix debut at the 2022 Skate America. In a pairs field marked by the absence of Russian competitors as a result of the Russo-Ukrainian War, Laurin/Éthier won the bronze medal, which he called "a big deal for us." They were seventh at Skate Canada International the following weekend.

Following the Grand Prix, Laurin/Éthier won the bronze medal at the 2022–23 Skate Canada Challenge to qualify to the 2023 Canadian Championships. They finished third in the short program at the national championships, but in the free skate they were overtaken by Pereira/Michaud for the bronze medal. Despite finishing fourth overall, they were named to compete at the 2023 Four Continents Championships. Laurin/Éthier finished seventh at the event, setting new personal bests in the process.

Programs 
with Éthier

Competitive highlights 
GP: Grand Prix; CS: Challenger Series; JGP: Junior Grand Prix

With Éthier

References

External links 
 

2005 births
Canadian female pair skaters
Living people
People from Saint-Jérôme